Morfa may refer to:

Places
 Conwy Morfa, North Wales, United Kingdom
 Morfa, Bridgend, South Wales, United Kingdom - an electoral ward
 Morfa, Swansea, South Wales, United Kingdom

Miscellaneous
 Morfa (drug), a highly potent opiate analgesic drug